Kallar Syedan Tehsil is a tehsil in the Rawalpindi District, Punjab, Pakistan. Earlier a part of the Kahuta Tehsil, it became a separate tehsil on 1 July 2004.

Kallar Syedan is the capital of the tehsil.

Demography
According to the 2017 census of Pakistan, Kallar Syedan Tehsil has a total population of 217,273. Many clans are living in Kallar Syedan Tehsil such as the Kashmiri Bhatt tribes, the Mughal tribe Baig (Looni sahlyal), the Mengal tribe (Mangal Rajgan), the Saroha Rajgan tribe, Gujjars, the Awan, the Raeen, the Ghakhar Kiani tribe, the Muhajir Siddiqui, the Mirza tribe, the Sheikh tribe, the Malik tribe and others.  The Bhakri Sadaat of Kallar Syedan are most prominent clan in this area. Because one study clearly defined them the founder of Kallar Syedan.

Administrative divisions

The tehsil is divided into 11 Union Councils:
 
 Municipal Committee Kallar Syedan City
Kallar Sagwal
 Kallar Badhal
 Tota
 Mera Sangal
 Mangloora
 Kambili
 Sadiq
 Looni Salyal
 Darkali Shershahi
 Mangal Rajgan
 Saroha
 Jocha
 Mamdot
 Jaswala
 Darkali Mamuri
 Choha Khalsa Circle Union Councils
 Nala Musalmana
 Manyanda
 Samote
 Choha Khalsa
 Kanoha
 Doberan Kallan
 Kallar Syedan Circle Union Councils
 Bhala Khar
 Guff
 Ghazan Abad
 Bishandote

Delimitation 2018
 After Delimitation 2018 of Election Commission of Pakistan, Kallar Syedan Tehsil is divided into two parts in National Assembly of Pakistan (1) Municipal Committee Kallar Syedan City and Kallar Syedan Circle Union Councils comes under NA-57 (Rawalpindi-I), and (2) Choha Khalsa Circle 6 Union Councils Comes Under NA-58 (Rawalpindi-II).
 In Provincial Assembly of Punjab Kallar Syedan Tehsil is divided into three parts: (1) Municipal Committee Kallar Syedan City and Choha Khalsa Circle 6 Union Councils come under PP-7 (Rawalpindi-II), (2) Kallar Syedan Circle Union Council Bishandote and Village Arazi Khas are under PP-9 (Rawalpindi-IV) and (3) Kallar Syedan Circle Union Councils Bhalakhar, Gufl and Ghazan Abad are under PP-10 (Rawalpindi-V).

Towns and villages 

Arazi
Azizpur Gujran
Bhatti
Bhalakhar
Bagh Boota
Balimah
Bangyal
Banal
Barota
Basanta
Batahri
Bawli 
Bhakhral
Bimmah Gangal
Bismillah Town
Bishandote
Chabutra
Chak Mirza
Chamak
Chamba Kerpal
Chanam
Chappar
Chappri Akku
Choha Khalsa
ChowkPindori
Dhamali
Dahan Gali
Darkali Mamuri
Darkali Sher Shahi
Dera Khalsa
Dhari
Dhari Syedan
Dheri Mirzian
Dhoke Buhari
Dhoke Captain Khaliq Awan
Dhoke Lt Miran Bakhsh
DhoKe Mahjian
Dhoke Moti Masjid
Dhoke Sub Amanat Hussain
Dhoke Sufi Ghulam Farid
Dhoke Adrain
Dhoke Baba Faiz Baksh
Doberan Kallan
Dhok Sabri
Ghangothi
Ghazan Abad
Gohi
Hayal Pindora
Her Dho Chakyal
Jabba
Jabba Channi
Jaswala
Jocha Mamdoot
Kaaliyah
Kalari
Kanoha
Khalwat
Khooe Lass
Kothi Syedan
Kund
Looni Bazdaran
Looni Salyal 
Mak Dhoke Bhattian
Majhar
Malook
Mangal Rajgan 
Mangloora Shareef
Manyanda
Merah Sangal 
Miana Mohra
Mohra Bakhtan
Mohra banni
Mohra Ropyal
Mohrah Adrian
Mohra Mareed
Nala Musalmana
Nambal
Nandna Jattal
Nothia
Pallal Mallahan
Peer Garata Syedan
Phata
Phalina
Sairi Saroha 
Pindora Hardo
Pind Mir Gala
Saintha 
Saaliyah
Saroha Chaudhrian
Saroha Rajgan
Sadda Kamal
Sakrana
Sakot
Sahib Dhamial
 Sohat Hayal Mughal
Samote
Samote Mirzan
Shah Khahi
Sir Suba Shah
Sumbal
Takal
Tamnoha
Tareel
Thala
Tota Rajgan
Walayat Abad
Zia Town

Notable people 
 Tikka Khan, Army Chief of Staff (1972–1976), Governor of East Pakistan (1971), Governor of Punjab (1988–1990)
 Abdul Aziz Mirza, Chief of Naval Staff, ambassador to Saudi Arabia
 Khem Singh Bedi,descendants of Guru Nanak Dev ji

Places of interest 

 Bedi Mahal
 Sangni Fort
 Pharwala Fort
 Phalina Noor Dam
 Old Gurdwara in Kanoha

Gallery

References

 
Tehsils of Rawalpindi District